The 2021 T1 League draft was the first edition of the T1 League's annual draft. It was held online on July 28, 2021 originally and broadcast on YouTube, Facebook and LINE TODAY. Due to the COVID-19 pandemic in Taiwan, the draft was postponed to August 9. There were six teams joined the draft, including the Kaohsiung Aquas, the New Taipei CTBC DEA, the Taichung Suns, the Tainan team, the Taiwan Beer and the Taoyuan Leopards. There were 58 players participated in the draft, and 17 players were chosen in 5 rounds.

First Round Contested Picks 

 Bolded team indicate who won the right to negotiate contract.
 The Tainan team chose Lan Shao-Fu after the first round contested picks.

Draft results 

 Reference：

Trade involving draft picks

Draft combine 
The T1 League invited all entrants and free agents to join the draft combine. The draft combine was held on July 26, 2021 originally. The draft combine was postponed to August 2 and held at National Taiwan University of Sport. There were 65 players participated in the draft combine.

Entrants 
The T1 League released its official list of entrants on July 24, 2021, consisting of 58 players from college and other educational institutions in this edition of the draft.

 Tung Fang Yi-Kang, G
 Liu Min-Yan, F/C
 Wei Chia-Hao, G
 Mohammad Al Bachir Gadiaga, SG
 Yang Cheng-Han, SG
 Huang Szu-Han, PG
 Chang Shun-Cheng, SG/F
 Yan Wen-Tso, SG/SF
 Zhou Cheng-Rui, PF
 Wu Nien-Che, SG
 Su Po-Hsuan, SG
 Lo Chen-Feng, SF
 Chang Shao-Chun, PF
 Du Szu-Han, G
 Lee Mo-Fan, F
 Wang Hsin-Wei, SG
 Hsiao Shao-Ting, G/SF
 Kao Hao-Yu, SG/SF
 Hsieh Ya-Hsuan, G/SF
 Lin Shih-Hsuan, G
 Wang Chen-Yuan, PG
 Tseng Yu-Hao, PF
 Lin Tzu-Feng, SG/SF
 Tsao Li-Chung, SF
 Wen Cheng-Wei, F
 Chen Cheng-Hsuan, F
 Lin Chun-En, G
 Wang Hung-Hao, G
 Zhu En-Lin, SG/F
 Yu Chu-Hsiang, PF/C
 Lee Cheng-Wei, G
 Su Wen-Ju, SG/SF
 Liu Chun-Ting, SG/SF
 Su Chih-Cheng, G
 Lan Shao-Fu, PF/C
 Tao Chun, SG/F
 Liu Hsuan-Yu, G
 Chen Hsiao-Yu, G
 Chen Yu-Wei, G
 Cheng Tzu-Feng, G/SF
 Yang Tzu-Yi, PG
 Chen Tsung-Hsien, G
 Huang Kai-Chieh, SG/SF
 Chiu Chung-Po, SF
 Huang Yi-Sheng, SG
 Cheng Chen-Wei, G
 Chang De-Feng, G

Club team recommendation 

 Lan Zhen-Yi, PG
 Huang Yu-Chieh, SG/SF
 Lin Kang-Yi, PG
 Chung Jen-Kuang, SG/SF
 Shih Hsin-Hung, SF
 Chuang Yu-Heng, G
 Hsu Shih-Hung, SF
 Ho Chia-Chun, G
 Zhou Chen-Wei, G
 Wang Sheng-Hsiang, G
 Chiang Chih-Sheng, F

Note

References 

T1 League draft
Draft
2021 in Taiwanese sport
August 2021 sports events in Asia